The Danish football league system, also known as the football league pyramid, refers to the hierarchically interconnected league structure for association football in Denmark, in which all divisions are bound together by the principle of promotion and relegation. Within men's association football, the top two professional levels contain one division each. Below this, the semi-professional and amateur levels have progressively more parallel divisions, which each cover progressively smaller geographic areas. The top four tiers are classed as nationwide, while the fifth tier and below are classed provincial leagues. Teams that finish at the top of their division at the end of each season can rise higher in the pyramid, while those that finish at the bottom find themselves sinking further down. In theory it is possible for even the lowest local amateur club to rise to the top of the system and become Danish football champions one day. The number of teams promoted and relegated between the divisions varies, and promotion to the upper levels of the pyramid is usually contingent on meeting additional criteria, especially concerning appropriate facilities and finances.

The league system is held under the jurisdiction of the Danish FA (DBU), Divisionsforeningen (DF) and its six regional associations. Dansk Arbejder Idrætsforbund (DAI) run a separate league system for their members. The men's senior league system excludes parallel leagues such as the Reserveliga, which runs in conjunction with primarily the Superliga as a national youth developmental and reserve league. The pyramid for women's football in Denmark runs separately with fewer divisions and levels. The women's top-flight league is semi-professional and additional criteria apply, the higher the team is placed in the league system.

Current structure

Men's league system
The Danish football league system is held under the jurisdiction of the national Danish Football Association (DBU) and its professional body Divisionsforeningen (DF), along with its six regional associations. On top of the hierarchical system sit the level one Superliga, the level two 1. division and the level three 2. division, collectively known as the Danmarksturneringen i fodbold (Herre-DM) and referred to as divisionerne, organised by the Divisionsforeningen. The top-flight league is professional, while the second-tier league consists primarily of professional and semi-professional teams, with the third-tier being a semi-professional league consisting of primarily semi-professional and amateur teams with some professional teams. The three top levels then are followed by the level four Danmarksserien (Herre-DS), the lowest league classed as nationwide and the highest fully amateur league, operated by the Danish FA itself. The fourth level and below are collectively referred to as serierne (roughly translated into non-league). At the fifth level, four parallel regional leagues are operated by four regional football associations, some of which have multiple divisions. The regional associations are divided by geographical boundaries.

The number of promotions and regulations between the highest regional leagues and below are dependent on the number of regional clubs regulated from the fourth tier. This also includes forced relegations of reserve teams, when the first team is being relegated to a lower level with their reserve team present. Reserve teams and mother clubs to superstructures are not allowed in the first three levels. The Reserveliga was created as a parallel competition outside of the league structure to run in conjunction with primarily the Superliga as a national youth developmental and reserve league. A separate league system exist, consisting of amateur clubs, and governed by the Dansk Arbejder Idrætsforbund (DAI).

The table below illustrates the current structure of the system. For each league, its official name in Danish and number of divisions and clubs is given. Each division promotes to the league(s) that lie directly above it and relegates to the league(s) that lie directly below it.

{|class="wikitable" style="text-align:center"
|-
!width=4%|Level
! colspan="6" width="96%" |League(s) / Division(s)
|-style="background:#efefef;"
|colspan="1"|
| colspan="6" style="text-align:center" |Professional Leagues
|-
|1
| colspan="6" |Superligaen12 clubs↓ 2 relegation spots
|-
|2
| colspan="6" |1. division12 clubs↑ 2 promotion spots, ↓ 2 relegation spots
|-style="background:#efefef;"
|colspan="1"|
| colspan="6" style="text-align:center" |Semi-Professional League
|-
|3
| colspan="6" |2. division12 clubs↑ 2 promotion spots, ↓ 2 relegation spots
|-
|4
| colspan="6" |3. division12 clubs↑ 2 promotion spots, ↓ 4 relegation spots
|-style="background:#efefef;"
| colspan="7" style="text-align:center" |Non-Professional Leagues
|-
|5
| colspan="6" |Danmarksserien4 divisions of 10 clubs↑ 4 promotion spots, ↓ 8 relegation spots
|-
|6
| colspan="2" width="32%" |Københavnsserien1 division of 14 clubs↑ 1 promotion spot, ↗ 1 qualification spot, ↓ 5 relegation spots
| width="16%" |Fynsserien1 division of 14 clubs↑ 1 promotion spot, ↓ 3-4 relegation spots
| width="16%" |Jyllandsserien 12 divisions of 8 clubs↑ 3 promotion spots, ↓ 3-6 relegation spots
| colspan="2" width="32%" |Sjællandsserien2 divisions of 14 clubs↑ 2 promotion spots, ↗ 1 qualification spot, ↓ 6 relegation spots
|-
|7
| width="16%" |DBU Københavns Serie 12 divisions of 12–14 clubs
| width="16%" |Bornholmsserien1 division of 6 clubs
↗ 1 qualification spot, ↓ 0-2 relegation spots
| width="16%" |DBU Fyns Serie 14 divisions of 6 clubs
| width="16%" |Jyllandsserien 23 divisions of 8 clubs↑ 3-6 promotion spots, ↓ 6-9 relegation spots
| width="16%" |Lolland-Falsterserien1 division of 12 clubs
↑ 2 promotion spots, ↓ 3 relegation spots
| width="16%" |DBU Sjællands Serie 12 divisions of 14 clubs
|-
|8
| width="16%" |DBU Københavns Serie 23 divisions of 12–13 clubs
| width="16%" |DBU Bornholms Serie 11 division of 5-6 clubs
| width="16%" |DBU Fyns Serie 28 divisions of 6 clubs
| width="16%" |DBU Jyllands Serie 16 divisions of 8 clubs
| width="16%" |DBU Lolland-Falsters Serie 11 division of 12 clubs
| width="16%" |DBU Sjællands Serie 24 divisions of 12 clubs
|-
|9
| width="16%" |DBU Københavns Serie 35 divisions of 12–14 clubs
| width="16%" |DBU Bornholms Serie 21 division of 5-6 clubs'
| width="16%" |DBU Fyns Serie 36 divisions of 12 clubs| width="16%" |DBU Jyllands Serie 212 divisions of 8 clubs| width="16%" |DBU Lolland-Falsters Serie 21 division of 12 clubs| width="16%" |DBU Sjællands Serie 38 divisions of 12 clubs|-
|10
| width="16%" |DBU Københavns Serie 45 divisions of 12–14 clubs|rowspan="3" width="16%" bgcolor="efefef" |
| width="16%" |DBU Fyns Serie 46-10 divisions of 11–12 clubs| width="16%" |DBU Jyllands Serie 324 divisions of 8 clubs| width="16%" |DBU Lolland-Falsters Serie 31 division of 11 clubs| width="16%" |DBU Sjællands Serie 412 divisions of 12 clubs|-
|11
| width="16%" |DBU Københavns Serie 510 divisions of 8–12 clubs| width="16%" |DBU Fyns Serie 51 division of 8 clubs| width="16%" |DBU Jyllands Serie 448 divisions of 8 clubs| rowspan="2" width="16%" bgcolor="efefef" |
| width="16%" |DBU Sjællands Serie 510 divisions of 12 clubs|-
|12
| width="16%" bgcolor="efefef" |
| width="16%" bgcolor="efefef" |
| width="16%" |DBU Jyllands Serie 596 divisions of 4–6 clubs| width="16%" |DBU Sjællands Serie 65 divisions of 11–12 clubs|}

Women's league system
The Danish women's football league system is administered by the Danish Football Association (DBU) and its special interests body Kvindedivisionsforeningen (KDF), along with its six regional associations. The highest level of women's league football in Denmark is the Kvindeligaen followed by the second-highest league Kvinde 1. division, collectively known as the Danmarksturneringen i kvindefodbold (Kvinde-DM) and referred to as divisionerne, organised by the Danish FA and Kvindedivisionsforeningen. The Kvindeligaen is considered a semi-professional league. The season culminates with two lowest placed teams of the Kvindeligaen and the four highest placed teams of the Kvinde 1. division competing in a qualification league tournament called Kvalifikationsligaen. The two tiers are then followed by the level three Kvindeserien (Kvinde-DS), the lowest nationwide league, but organised by the regional football associations. The third level and below are collectively referred to as serierne (or non-league). The number of local relegated teams from the second-tier to third-tier determines the number of promotion and relegation spots between the third-tier and below. Reserve teams and mother clubs to superstructures playing at a higher level are only allowed to play in the second-tier and below. Women's teams of DBU Lolland-Falster participate in DBU Zealand regional league structure, while women's teams of DBU Bornholm participate in the DBU Copenhagen regional leagues.

The six levels of women's football in Denmark are structured as follows. For each league, its official name in Danish and number of divisions and clubs is given. Each division promotes to the league(s) that lie directly above it and relegates to the league(s) that lie directly below it.

System by period
Men's league history
The first domestic club league was founded in 1889 with the establishment of the Fodboldturneringen, comprising seven amateur clubs exclusively based in Copenhagen, deciding the Copenhagen Football Championship and governed by the Danish Football Association (DBU). In the following years, several regional league structures emerged with the establishment of the regional football associations. Five of the newly founded provincial football associations, Jutland FA, Zealand FA, Funen FA, Lolland-Falster FA and Bornholm FA, became part of the Danish Football Association (DBU). With the formation of a regional FA for the capital city in 1903, the administration of the Copenhagen Football League was transferred to the Copenhagen FA. These six regional football competitions were the top-flight leagues, determining the regional club football championship. Between 1912 and 1927, the Danish football championship was determined via a play-off cup tournament at the end of the season, known as the Landsfodboldturneringen.

The first nationwide championship league competition, known as the Danmarksmesterskabsturneringen, had its inaugural season in 1927–28, and the tournament expanded two years later with a secondary national league. There was no avenue for progression between the national top-flight tournament and regional leagues until 1936, where the best clubs were permanently moved out of the highest regional championship leagues. From 1927 to 1935 the Danish league pyramid had two simultaneous and independent pyramids, the national pyramid, and the regional pyramid, and the best clubs were playing in both pyramids. The national league structure was reconstructed after World War II with the formation of three nationwide leagues with an equal number of clubs and matches. The current interconnected league system has been in place since 2004, when the regional leagues were reorganised. Professionalism (then referred to as betalt fodbold'') in Danish football was introduced in 1978, but was restricted to the top three levels. In 1986, Brøndby IF became the first Danish club with a squad of full time professional players contracts and the first to be listed on the stock exchange in 1987.

Men's league timeline
The timeline below lists the evolution of the men's tiers and leagues related to the Danish FA since 1889, including the regional league structures of DBU Copenhagen, DBU Jutland and DBU Bornholm, and the regional top-flights of DBU Funen, DBU Zealand and DBU Lolland-Falster. Excluded are Landsfodboldturneringen (1912–13 until 1926–27) and Kvalifikations-Cupturneringen (1946 until 1950), which were end-of-the season cup tournaments, and the first seasons of Kvalifikationsturneringen (1950–51 until 1958) was a qualification tournament held at the end of the season.

Source:

Women's league timeline
The timeline below lists the evolution of the women's tiers and leagues related to the Danish FA and DBU Copenhagen, specifically the women's association football being administrated by the Danish FA since 1972. Excluded are the women's national championship in the first two seasons (1973 and 1974), which were end-of-the season cup tournaments.

Source:

References

 
Football league systems in Europe